West Virginia's 2nd Senate district is one of 17 districts in the West Virginia Senate. It is currently represented by Republicans Mike Maroney and Charles H. Clements. All districts in the West Virginia Senate elect two members to staggered four-year terms.

Geography
District 2 is based in the Mid-Ohio Valley region, covering all of Calhoun, Doddridge, Ritchie, Tyler, and Wetzel Counties and parts of Gilmer, Marion, Marshall, and Monongalia Counties. It includes the communities of Moundsville, McMechen, New Martinsville, Paden City, Mannington, Pennsboro, Sistersville, and Grantsville.

The district is located largely within West Virginia's 1st congressional district, with a small portion extending into West Virginia's 2nd congressional district, and overlaps with the 4th, 5th, 6th, 7th, 33rd, 34th, 50th, and 51st districts of the West Virginia House of Delegates. It borders the states of Ohio and Pennsylvania.

Recent election results

2022

Historical election results

2020

2018

2016

2014

2012

Federal and statewide results in District 2

References

2
Calhoun County, West Virginia
Doddridge County, West Virginia
Gilmer County, West Virginia
Marion County, West Virginia
Marshall County, West Virginia
Monongalia County, West Virginia
Ritchie County, West Virginia
Tyler County, West Virginia
Wetzel County, West Virginia